Bangu may refer to:
 Bangladeshi, people, things or mannerisms from the country and culture of Bangladesh, an informal term used to represent anything Bangladeshi
 Bamileke, a Semi-Bantu ethnic group of people from Cameroon
 Bangu (neighborhood), a district of Rio de Janeiro, Brazil
 Bangu (drum), a Chinese percussion instrument
 Bangu Atlético Clube, a football team in Bangu, Rio de Janeiro
  a cargo ship built as Ophis in 1919 and later known as Empire Antelope

See also 
 Ban Gu, a Chinese historian of Han dynasty
 Bân gú, a group of Chinese dialects
 Bangus, Filipino for "Milkfish"
 Bangui (disambiguation)